Emanuel Mirchev (born 9 February 2002) is a professional footballer who plays as a midfielder for German Regionalliga club FC Teutonia Ottensen. Born in Germany, he represented Germany at youth international level before switching his allegiance to Bulgaria.

Club career
Mirchev is a former youth academy player of Hamburger SV. He joined German third division club SC Verl in June 2021. He made his professional debut for the club on 25 July in a goalless draw against Türkgücü München.

International career
Mirchev is a former German youth national team player. He has played a friendly for under-15 team in 2017. He switched his allegiance to Bulgaria in 2019 and represented them at qualifiers of 2020 UEFA European Under-19 Championship.

Personal life
Mirchev was born to Bulgarian parents who moved to Germany in 1991.

Career statistics

References

External links
 Emanuel Mirchev at DFB 
 

2002 births
Living people
Footballers from Hamburg
Association football midfielders
Bulgarian footballers
Bulgaria youth international footballers
German footballers
Germany youth international footballers
German people of Bulgarian descent
3. Liga players
Regionalliga players
SC Verl players
FC Teutonia Ottensen players